Springfield Recreation Area is a state recreation area in Bon Homme County, South Dakota in the United States. The recreation area is located on the upper part of Lewis and Clark Lake, and is popular for boating, fishing, and hunting. There is a 20-site campground and a boat launch to access the lake and the Missouri River. The area is about 30 miles west of Yankton.

See also
List of South Dakota state parks
Gavins Point Dam

References

External links
 Springfield Recreation Area - South Dakota Department of Game, Fish, and Parks

Protected areas of Bon Homme County, South Dakota
Protected areas of South Dakota
State parks of South Dakota